Woodway is an unincorporated community in Lee County, Virginia, United States.

Elk Knob Elementary School is located in the community.

History
A post office was established at Woodway in 1935, and remained in operation until it was discontinued in 1963. The community was named for a postmaster.

References

Unincorporated communities in Lee County, Virginia
Unincorporated communities in Virginia